HMS Amphion was an  scout cruiser built for the Royal Navy before the First World War. Completed in 1913, she was initially assigned to the First Fleet and became a destroyer flotilla leader in mid-1914. When the war began, her flotilla was assigned to the Harwich Force. While patrolling on the first full day of the war, Amphion and her destroyers encountered and sank a German minelayer, SMS Königin Luise, but not before she had laid many of her mines. While returning from patrolling the following morning, Amphion struck a mine on 6 August 1914 off the Thames Estuary and sank with the loss of 132 crewmen killed. She was the first ship of the Royal Navy to be sunk in the First World War. The wreck site is protected and may not be dived upon without permission from the Ministry of Defence.

Design and description
The Active-class ships were the last class of turbine-powered scout cruisers ordered by the Admiralty. These ships were intended to work with destroyer flotillas, leading their torpedo attacks and backing them up when attacked by other destroyers, although they quickly became less useful as destroyer speeds increased before the First World War. Her crew consisted of 289 officers and ratings.

The main armament of the Active class consisted of ten breech-loading (BL)  Mk VII guns. The forward pair of guns were mounted side by side on a platform on the forecastle, six were amidships, three on each broadside, and the two remaining guns were on the centreline of the quarterdeck, one ahead of the other. Her secondary armament was four quick-firing (QF) three-pounder  Vickers Mk I guns and two submerged 18-inch (450 mm) torpedo tubes.

As scout cruisers, the ships were only lightly protected to maximise their speed. Their conning tower was protected by four inches of armour.

Construction and career
Ordered as part of the 1910 Naval Programme, Amphion was laid down at Pembroke Dockyard's No. 5 Slipway on 15 March 1911 and launched on 4 December by Mrs. Mundy, wife of the dockyard's Captain-Superintendent, Captain Geoffrey Mundy. She was completed in March 1913 and her first commander was Captain Frederic Dreyer with Lieutenant John Tovey as his First Lieutenant. Amphion was commissioned on 2 April and assigned to the 4th Battle Squadron of the First Fleet. A month later, the ship was assigned to the 1st Light Cruiser Squadron by 18 May. She remained with the squadron for nearly a year and was serving as the flotilla leader of the 3rd Destroyer Flotilla by 18 June 1914.

By the start of the First World War in August, Amphion and her flotilla was assigned to the Harwich Force, defending the eastern approaches to the English Channel, under the command of Captain Cecil H. Fox. In the morning of 5 August, Amphion and the 3rd Flotilla sortied into the North Sea to patrol the area between Harwich and the Dutch island of Terschelling for German activity. At 10:15 a ship in the black, buff, and yellow colours of the Great Eastern Railway's steamers that plied between Harwich and the Hook of Holland was spotted. Amphion led the flotilla to investigate and observed that the fleeing ship was deploying mines even then.

The target was SMS Königin Luise, a former Hamburg-Heligoland excursion boat that had been converted to an auxiliary minelayer by the Germans. They had planned to mount a pair of  guns on board, but they did not have the time to do so; her only armament was a pair of lighter guns and 180 mines. On the night of 4 August, she had departed Emden and headed into the North Sea to lay mines off the Thames Estuary, which she began to do at dawn.

By noon, Königin Luise was sinking and the three British ships rescued 5 officers and 70 ratings. The flotilla proceeded onwards with their patrol until they reached the Dutch coast around 21:00 and turned for home. He guessed wrongly and led his flotilla over the danger area.

At 06:35, Amphion struck a mine that detonated underneath her bridge. The explosion set her forecastle on fire and broke the ship's keel. The destroyer  attempted to tow the cruiser, but a deep crack across her upper deck showed that she was hogging badly and Fox ordered his crew to abandon ship. Shortly afterwards, her forward magazine exploded, throwing one 4-inch gun into the air that narrowly missed Linnet. One of Amphions shells burst on the deck of the destroyer , killing two of her men and the only German prisoner rescued from the cruiser. Amphion then rapidly sank within 15 minutes of the explosion losing 1 officer and 131 ratings killed in the sinking, plus an unknown number of the crew rescued from Königin Luise. The wreck is a protected site under the Protection of Military Remains Act 1986.

Notes

References

External links
 

 

Active-class cruisers
Ships built in Pembroke Dock
1911 ships
World War I cruisers of the United Kingdom
World War I shipwrecks in the North Sea
Protected Wrecks of the United Kingdom
Maritime incidents in August 1914
Ships sunk by mines